Aberdeen Gardens may refer to:

Aberdeen Gardens, Washington, census-designated place (CDP) in Grays Harbor County, Washington, USA
Aberdeen Gardens (Hampton, Virginia), historic district located in Hampton, Virginia, USA

See also 
 Aberdeen (disambiguation)